Diskos was a Yugoslav state-owned record label, founded in 1962 and based in Aleksandrovac, SR Serbia.

Initially, Diskos published pop and rock music, publishing records by some of the pioneers of the Yugoslav rock scene, like Iskre, Siluete, Tomi Sovilj i Njegove Siluete, Sanjalice and Novi Fosili, and later moved mostly towards folk music.

Artists
Some of the artists that had been signed to Diskos include:

 Jašar Ahmedovski
 Apartman 69
 Silvana Armenulić
 Nedeljko Bajić Baja
 Šaban Bajramović
 Ana Bekuta
 Zorica Brunclik
 Crni Biseri
 Dah
 Zekerijah Đezić
 Iskre
 Južni Vetar
 Jelena Karleuša
 Mile Kitić
 Šerif Konjević
 Lepa Lukić
 Maja Marijana
 Kemal Malovčić
 Zlatko Manojlović
 Srđan Marjanović
 Vera Matović
 Seid Memić Vajta
 Mitar Mirić
 Dragana Mirković
 Jasmin Muharemović
 Dušan Nikolić
 Lola Novaković
 Novi Fosili
 Opus
 Himzo Polovina
 Šako Polumenta
 Džej Ramadanovski
 Nino Rešić
 Sinan Sakić
 Beba Selimović
 Siluete
 Tomi Sovilj i Njegove Siluete
 Mira Stupica
 Šemsa Suljaković
 Suncokret
 Mira Škorić
 Teška Industrija
 Novica Urošević
 Vatreni Poljubac
 Milić Vukašinović
 Zebra
 Zlatni Prsti
 Toma Zdravković

During its initial years, Diskos also published comedy records by actors Mija Aleksić and Miodrag Petrović Čkalja, records of Italian pop singers, like Adriano Celentano, Tony Dallara and Gino Volpe, for the Yugoslav market, as well as several records of spiritual music.

Like other former Yugoslav labels, Diskos was also licensed to release foreign titles for the Yugoslav market which included certain albums by: America, Louis Armstrong, The Band, Count Basie, Jeff Beck, Pat Benatar, Chuck Berry, Blondie, The Byrds, Chicago, Miles Davis, Fats Domino, The Doors, Bob Dylan, Duke Ellington, Ella Fitzgerald, Roberta Flack, Aretha Franklin, Jethro Tull, Carole King, Kiss, Kris Kristofferson, Led Zeppelin, Little Feat, Madness, The Manhattan Transfer, Matchbox, Men Without Hats, Liza Minnelli, Osibisa, Ram Jam, Redbone, Santana, Boz Scaggs, Sherbet, Simon & Garfunkel, Spandau Ballet, Bruce Springsteen, Rod Stewart, Barbra Streisand, James Taylor, Van Halen, Weather Report, Wild Cherry, Teddy Wilson, Yazoo and Yes.

Competition
Other major labels in the former Socialist Federal Republic of Yugoslavia were: PGP-RTB and Jugodisk from Belgrade, Jugoton and Suzy from Zagreb, Diskoton from Sarajevo, ZKP RTLJ from Ljubljana, and others.

See also
 List of record labels

References

External links
Diskos on Discogs

Serbian record labels
Yugoslav record labels
Serbian rock music
Yugoslav rock music
Serbian music history
Record labels established in 1962
1962 establishments in Yugoslavia
State-owned record labels